Michael James Ramsey (born July 8. 1960) is an American former professional baseball center fielder who played for the Los Angeles Dodgers of the Major League Baseball (MLB).

Career
Ramsey was signed as an undrafted free agent by the Cincinnati Reds on May 20, 1979 and played in the Reds minor league system for three years before he was traded to the Los Angeles Dodgers in 1982 for Ted Power.

After three seasons in the Dodgers farm system with the Vero Beach Dodgers, San Antonio Dodgers and Albuquerque Dukes, he made the Dodgers opening day starting lineup in 1987. He went 2 for 4 as the starting center fielder that day. He played in 48 games with the Dodgers in 1987, finishing with a .232 average. He was returned to the minors and spent the next two seasons with the minor league teams of the Dodgers, Milwaukee Brewers and California Angels before retiring from baseball following the 1989 season.

External links

1960 births
Living people
Albuquerque Dukes players
American expatriate baseball players in Canada
Baseball players from Georgia (U.S. state)
Edmonton Trappers players
El Paso Diablos players
Eugene Emeralds players
Lodi Dodgers players
Major League Baseball outfielders
People from Thomson, Georgia
San Antonio Dodgers players
Tampa Tarpons (1957–1987) players
Vero Beach Dodgers players